Ernest Barry may refer to:

 Ernest Barry (rower) (1882–1968), British rower
 Ernest Barry (footballer) (born 1967), Maltese football goalkeeper